The 1974–75 Magyar Kupa (English: Hungarian Cup) was the 35th season of Hungary's annual knock-out cup football competition.

Final

See also
 1974–75 Nemzeti Bajnokság I

References

External links
 Official site 
 soccerway.com

1974–75 in Hungarian football
1974–75 domestic association football cups
1974-75